ANA. all in  is a Spanish legal thriller limited television series adapting the Roberto Santiago's novel Ana. It is jointly produced by RTVE, Tornasol, DeAPlaneta and ZDF Enterprises. Directed by Salvador García and Gracia Querejeta, the series stars Maribel Verdú for the leading role. It was released on RTVE Play on 21 September 2021.

Premise 
After Alejandro is accused of killing the manager of the Gran Castilla Casino, his sister Ana Tramel (a lawyer at a low ebb) sets up a small team to pick up an unequal fight versus the powerful gambling industry.

The fiction is set in Madrid, and some parts also take place in Pamplona.

Cast

Production and release 
Consisting of 6 episodes featuring a running time of around 60 minutes, filming started in Pamplona in June 2020. RTVE announced the release date of the full series on RTVE Play for 21 September 2021, the same date as the debut of the linear TV run on La 1. The opening of the series features illustrations by Paula Bonet and a theme song ("Una y otra vez") performed by Marlango and Vetusta Morla's Guille Galván.

Accolades 

|-
| align = "center" rowspan = "2" | 2021 || 60th Monte-Carlo Television Festival || colspan = "2" | Best Fiction (series) ||  || 
|-
| 27th Forqué Awards || Best Actress (TV series) || Maribel Verdú ||  || 
|-
| align = "center" rowspan = "3" | 2022 || 9th Feroz Awards || Best Actress (TV series)  || Maribel Verdú ||  || 
|-
| 30th Actors and Actresses Union Awards || Best Film Actress in a Secondary Role || Natalia Verbeke ||  || 
|-
| 9th Platino Awards || Best Actress in a Miniseries or TV Series || Maribel Verdú ||  || 
|}

References

External links 
 Ana Tramel. El juego on RTVE Play

RTVE Play original programming
2021 Spanish television series debuts
2021 Spanish television series endings
2020s Spanish drama television series
2020s legal television series
Spanish-language television shows
Television shows filmed in Spain
Spanish legal drama television series
Television shows about gambling
Spanish thriller television series
Television series based on Spanish novels
Television shows set in Madrid